Richard Earl "Reb" Beach Jr. (born August 31, 1963) is an American rock guitarist. He is a member of the bands Winger and Whitesnake.

Career 
After graduating from Fox Chapel Area High School and attending Berklee College of Music in the early 1980s, he played in Fiona's backing band and became an accomplished studio musician, working with the likes of Howard Jones, Chaka Khan, The Bee Gees, Twisted Sister, and Roger Daltrey, among others, showcasing Beach's ability to adapt to various musical styles.

While working with Fiona, he was introduced to Kip Winger, who was touring with Alice Cooper at the time. Eventually they formed the band Sahara along with Rod Morgenstein and Paul Taylor, which was later renamed to Winger.

Winger recorded and toured in support of three albums, Winger (1988), In the Heart of the Young (1990) and Pull (1993). The band also released a number of hit singles, including "Seventeen", "Madalaine", "Headed for a Heartbreak" and "Miles Away".

After Winger disbanded in the mid-1990s, Beach first joined Alice Cooper's band and later replaced George Lynch in the heavy metal band Dokken. With Dokken he recorded one studio album, titled Erase the Slate, and a live DVD, titled Live from the Sun.

He was also involved with Sega, as he recorded the soundtrack for the video game Daytona USA 2.

Since leaving Dokken, Beach has been a part of several different recording and touring projects. In addition to sporadic touring with Winger, he released a solo effort entitled Masquerade in 2002. Since 2002, he has been a member of David Coverdale's current incarnation of Whitesnake and has been the longest-serving guitarist/member of the band to this day, excluding Coverdale.

A "supergroup" project called The Mob with King's X frontman dUg Pinnick and Night Ranger drummer Kelly Keagy resulted in a single self-titled album, released in 2005.

A reformed Winger released their first studio recording in over a decade, IV, in 2006.

He replaced Jeff Watson in Night Ranger for a series of dates in Japan and the US, but announced his departure in January 2008.

He splits his time between Winger and Whitesnake, recording Better Days Comin' in 2014 with the former band, and The Purple Album with the latter in 2015. He continues to tour with both acts.

According to bandmate Kip Winger, Reb is quite adept at coming up with multiple rock riffs at a time, though he is often unable to remember them later.

Ibanez guitars produced his signature RBM models (stands for Reb Beach Model) in the early 1990s. On the 2005 Whitesnake reunion tour, he primarily used custom models by luthier Suhr Guitars.

Discography

Guest appearances 
Howard Jones – One to One (1986)
Chaka Khan – Destiny (1986)
Bee Gees – E•S•P (1987) on the songs, "E•S•P", "Overnight"
Twisted Sister – Love Is for Suckers (1987)
The Lost Boys soundtrack (1987) with Roger Daltrey on the song, "Don't Let the Sun Go Down on Me"
Brian McDonald Group – Desperate Business (1988)
Minoru Niihara – One (1989)
Xenon – America's New Design (1989)
The Karate Kid Part III soundtrack (1989) with Winger on the song "Out for the Count"
Bill and Ted's Bogus Journey soundtrack (1991) with Winger on the song "Battle Stations"
Guitars that Rule the World (1991)
Danger Danger – Cockroach (1993)
Smoke on the Water – A Tribute to Deep Purple (1994)
Andy Timmons – EarX-tacy 2 (1997)
Alice Cooper – A Fistful of Alice (1997)
Guitar Battle (1998)
Daytona USA 2 Game soundtrack (1998)
This Conversation Seems Like a Dream (1998)
Bat Head Soup – A Tribute to Ozzy Osbourne (2000)
A Tribute to Van Halen (2000)
Brian McDonald – Wind it Up (2000)
War and Peace – Light at the End of the Tunnel (2000)
Stone Cold Queen: A Tribute (2001)
Brian McDonald – Voyage (2003)
Ken Tamplin and Friends – Wake the Nations (2003)
XCarnation – Grounded (2005)
Kelly Keagy – I'm Alive (2006)
Northern Light Orchestra – Celebrate Christmas (2010)
Rob Moratti – Victory (2011)

Video albums 
Winger – The Videos: Volume One (1989)
Winger – In the Heart of the Young (1990)
Winger – In the Heart of the Young Part 2 (1991)
Winger – Live in Tokyo (1991)
Solo – Cutting Loose VHS (Instructional videos, 1991)
Winger – The Making of Pull (1993)
Dokken – Live from the Sun (2002)
Solo – Homegrown Private Lesson Volume 1 DVD (Instructional videos, 2003)
Whitesnake – Live... in the Still of the Night (2006)
Winger – The Making of Winger IV (2006)
Winger – Winger Live (2007)

See also 
Winger
The Mob
Whitesnake
Alice Cooper

References

External links 

 Official website
 Official Whitesnake website

1963 births
Living people
Lead guitarists
Musicians from Pittsburgh
American rock guitarists
American heavy metal guitarists
Glam metal musicians
Alice Cooper (band) members
Dokken members
Night Ranger members
Winger (band) members
Whitesnake members
Berklee College of Music alumni
Progressive metal guitarists
Guitarists from Pennsylvania
20th-century American guitarists
20th-century American male musicians
21st-century American guitarists
21st-century American male musicians
The Mob (American band) members